Chevry may refer to the following locations in France:

 Chevry, Ain, in the Ain département
 Chevry, Manche, in the Manche département
 Chevry-Cossigny, in the Seine-et-Marne département
 Chevry-en-Sereine, in the Seine-et-Marne département
 Chevry-sous-le-Bignon, in the Loiret département
 Chevry, a section of Gif-sur-Yvette, in the Essonne département